Cycas cupida is a species of cycad native to Queensland.

References

cupida
Flora of Queensland
Plants described in 2001
Taxa named by Paul Irwin Forster